The following is a list of events affecting Philippine television in 2010. Events listed include television show debuts, finales, cancellations, and channel launches, closures and rebrandings, as well as information about controversies and carriage disputes.

Events

January
January 8: ABS-CBN Broadcasting Corporation launched "iWant TV", an over-the-top content streaming media service platform that airs or streams some favorite programs and shows, as well as livestreaming of its some well-loved channels.
January 9: Sharon Cuneta (44-years-old) wins the top prize winner of 2 Million pesos of Who Wants to Be a Millionaire?.

February
February 6: Ethel Booba, Long Mejia and Vice Ganda of the Team Boom Boom Pow wins the last defending champion of The Singing Bee: Season 5 it's the officially signed off.
February 13: Melisa Cantiveros wins Pinoy Big Brother: Double Up (season 3).
February 16: MTV Philippines officially signed off on cable television with the last music video: Video Killed the Radio Star by The Buggles. After the closure, it had reverted to its original channel, MTV Southeast Asia.
February 21: Sarah Lahbati and Steven Silva won the fifth season of StarStruck.

March
 March 6: Yoyo Tricker was hailed as the Ultimate Talentado in Talentadong Pinoy Season 1.

April
 April 1: Smart Communications and 360media suspended the operations of myTV due to the service's expiration of its three-year permit to broadcast issued from National Telecommunications Commission.
 April 4: TV5 launches the "Kapatid" network.
 April 5: Aksyon, is the evening national newscast in Filipino of TV5, was launched with former GMA anchor Paolo Bediones and former ABS-CBN anchor Cheryl Cosim.
 April 5: In response to TV5's newscast Aksyon, News on Q made several changes, including Connie Sison joining the newscast, extending its runtime to 1 hour and reverting to the Filipino language it used from 2005 to 2007.

May
May 10–11: Automated national elections was held in the Philippines for the first time.
May 27: The name "ABS-CBN Corporation" started to be used to reflect with the company's diversification as the company focuses on other businesses aside from television broadcasting, with "ABS-CBN Broadcasting Corporation" name is still used alternatively on some uses.

June
June 13: 16-year-old singer Jovit Baldivino from Padre Garcia, Batangas Province wins the first season of Pilipinas Got Talent.
June 19: 
 GMA Network celebrated their 60th anniversary on Philippine television at the Araneta Coliseum, its presentation was titled GMA at 60: The Heart Of Television.
 TV5 celebrated its 50th anniversary on Philippine television.
June 26: 17-year-old James Reid wins season 3 of Pinoy Big Brother: Teen Edition.

July
July 23: Ruther Robosa emerged as Diz iz Kantahan Grand Champion.
July 24: XB Gensan wins as Showtime's first grand champion, the grand finals of which were held at Ynares Sports Arena, Antipolo City.

October
October 23: Jugs and Teddy was hailed as Showtime's first anniversary champion.

November
November 8: On TV Patrol (the longest-running evening newscast), Korina Sanchez and former Vice-President Noli "Kabayan" de Castro finally return as they joined with Ted Failon.
November 22: Julius Babao and Karen Davila joined Ces Oreña-Drilon on Bandila.

December
December 18: Laoag City Gymnastics Group wins as Showtime's second grand champion.
December 31: Commercial model Alden Richards made his first television appearance on GMA New Year Countdown to 2011 in preparation for his first project called Alakdana.

Premieres

Unknown Dates

March: Oggy and the Cockroaches on TV5
July:
 Chuggington on TV5
 Fullmetal Alchemist: Brotherhood on TV5
 Clannad on TV5
 Street Fighter II V on TV5
 Yo Gabba Gabba! on TV5
 Camp Tiger on TV5
 Celebrity Cook-Off on TV5
August: Teledyaryo Business on NBN 4
September:
 Camp Lazlo on TV5
 Ed, Edd, & Eddy on TV5
 The Powerpuff Girls on TV5
 League of Super Evil on TV5
 My Gym Partner's a Monkey on TV5
 Oplan Zero Tambay on TV5
December: Kick Buttowski: Suburban Daredevil on TV5

Unknown

 Misa Nazareno on TV5
 GSIS Members Hour on NBN 4
 Nation's Peacemakers on IBC 13
 SSS: Kabalikat Natin on IBC 13
 Johnny Bravo on TV5
 Bagong Maunlad na Agrikultura on IBC 13
 Chinatown TV on IBC 13

Returning or renamed programs

Programs transferring networks

Finales

Unknown Dates
 January: Chelsea Lately (ETC on SBN 21)
 May: Soul Mix (TV5 and TV Maria)
 June: The Working President (NBN 4, RPN 9 and IBC 13)
 August: Money Matters (NBN 4)
 October:
 Y Speak (Studio 23)
 Sarah Geronimo Concert Series (TV5)
 Camp Tiger (TV5)
 December: Oplan Zero Tambay (TV5)

Unknown

Networks

Launches
April 12: Screen Red
July 26: Universal Channel
September 19: Diva Universal
October 16: NBA Premium TV
December 20: CgeTV

Unknown
 E! (Asia)

Rebranded
 January 1: Star Movies Asia → Star Movies Philippines
 September 19: Hallmark Channel → Diva Universal
 December 4: AXN Beyond Southeast Asia → AXN Beyond Philippines

Closures
 February 16: MTV Philippines
 August 17: MMDA TV
 September 18: Hallmark Channel Philippines
 September 30: Maxxx

Births
February 19: Alonzo Muhlach, child actor
September 15: Robbie Wachtel
October 1: Onyok Pineda, child actor
October 3: Seth dela Cruz, child actor
October 7: Lucho Agoncillo, young endorser and actor, the son of Judy Ann Santos and Ryan Agoncillo
October 14: Leanne Bautista, child actress

Deaths
 January 6: Mila Ocampo, 68, former actress and mother of Snooky Serna (born 1941)
 February 26: Oscar Obligacion, 86, veteran comedian (born 1924)
 March 5: Marco Polo Garcia, 39, former child star (born 1970)
 April 12: Palito (Reynaldo Hipolito), 76, veteran comedian (born 1933)
 July 23: Prospero Luna, 79, comedian-actor (born 1931)
 July 25: Redford White (Cipriano Cermeno II), 54, actor and comedian (born 1955)
 August 8: Charlie Davao, 75, Filipino actor, father of actor Ricky Davao (born 1935)
 August 11: Margaret Jao-Grey, 57, Filipino journalist and columnist Philippine Star and Business Mirror (born 1952)
 August 21: Melody Gersbach, 24, Binibining Pilipinas International 2009 (born 1986)
 October 7: Metring David, 90, actress-comedian (born 1920)
 October 30: Kirk Abella, 32, Filipino actor (born 1978)
 November 16: Wyngard Tracy, 58, talent manager & television personality
 December 26: Pablo Gomez, 81, writer, radio announcer of DZRH and director (born 1929)
 December 29: Rejoice Rivera (Diane Marie Santos), 26, singer, dancer & member of Baywalk Bodies (born 1984)

See also
2010 in television

References

 
Television in the Philippines by year
2010s in Philippine television
Philippine television-related lists